Abubakar Tafawa Balewa University (ATBU) is a federal university of technology located in Bauchi, north east Nigeria. The university is named after the first and only Prime Minister of the Federal Republic of Nigeria, Sir Abubakar Tafawa Balewa. The motto of the university is "Doctrina Mater Artium", which means "Education is the mother of the practical arts".

The university was established in 1980 as the Federal University of Technology, Bauchi. The institution's first students were admitted in October 1981 for pre-degree and remedial programmes while the degree courses of the School of Science and Science Education began in October 1982. On 1 October 1984, the university was merged with Ahmadu Bello University, Zaria, Nigeria with a change of name to Abubakar Tafawa Balewa College, Ahmadu Bello University, Bauchi campus. The university regained its autonomous status in 1988 following a general demerger of such institutions. This was followed by a change of name to Abubakar Tafawa Balewa University, Bauchi.

The academic pattern of the university was formulated in 1980 after consultation with subject experts from Nigeria, United Kingdom and the United States of America. The curriculum adopted was applied in nature, as suited a technologically based institution, and this theme is maintained in all the units of the university.

The university offers degrees through seven schools: the School of Engineering, Science, Environmental Technology, Agriculture, Management Technology, the School of Technology Education and College of Medical Sciences. It offers entry level bachelor's degrees and both Masters and Doctorate degrees. Each school is headed by a Dean/Provost who reports directly to the Vice Chancellor. The Vice Chancellor is the executive head of the university. The Vice Chancellor is appointed by the Federal Ministry of Education on recommendation by the Governing Council of the University.

University Library 
The University Library was established in 1981 to support teaching, learning and research process with over 1000 seating capacity, 161,672 volumes of books, 3442 journal titles and serial titles of 2117. the virtual library has more than 50 computers that is  internet networked with KOHA as its software for its days to day operation. the university library purchased subscribed databases and also free access to some which are HINARI, AGTORA and ESBCOHOST etc.

Administration

Abubakar Tafawa Balewa University has a chancellor as the ceremonial head of the university, while the Vice-chancellor is the chief executive and academic officer of the university. The vice-chancellor is usually appointed for a 5-year, non-renewable term. The 8th and current vice-chancellor, Professor Muhammad A. AbdulAzeez.

Since inception the University has been managed by the following Chief Executives:

Currently, the university has over 30 Academic Departments, 6 Faculties, 8 Directorates and 7 Centers, with an undergraduate students’ population of over 10,000. A college of Medical Science has been established in the University and has since taken off.

Faculties 
The University Has the following Faculties:

Faculty of Agriculture & Agricultural Technology

Faculty of Engineering & Engineering Technology

Faculty of Environmental Technology

Faculty of Management Technology

Faculty of Technology Education

Faculty of Science

College of Medicine 
The University has a college of medical Sciences that offers medical and health related courses.
Also it has a college hospital Abubakar Tafawa Balewa University Bauchi Teaching Hospital where medical Attentions is being attended to.

Academic Support Units 
There are two directorates that provides academic support services to the university. These are:

1. Directorate of Basic and Remedial Studies

2. General Studies Directorate

School of Postgraduate Studies 
The School of Postgraduate Studies of ATBU is saddled with the following responsibility

Coordinating all the postgraduate programme of studies in the University, such as postgraduate planning, admission, registration and examination.
Maintenance of postgraduate academic standards, and
Monitoring and evaluating the progress of postgraduate studies in the University and submission of an annual report to Senate.

Notable alumni
Isa Ali Pantami Nigerian Minister of Communications and Digital Economy.

Inuwa Kashifu Abdullahi Director-General of the National Information Technology Development Agency (NITDA).

Notable Faculty Alumni
Saket Kushwaha former dean of School of Management.

See also
Abubakar Tafawa Balewa University Library

References

External links 
 Official ATBU site
 Review of ATBU Bauchi conducted By Abdullahi Abdullahi (mayomayo) Toro.

Federal universities of Nigeria
Abubakar Tafawa Balewa University
Educational institutions established in 1980
1980 establishments in Nigeria
Education in Bauchi State
Technological universities in Nigeria